The Staphylococcus phage P68 Putative Holin (P68 Hol) Family (TC# 1.E.38) consists of a single putative holin (TC# 1.E.38.1.1) from Staphylococcus aureus phage P68 that is 92 amino acyl residues (aas) in length and exhibits 2 transmembrane segments (TMSs). While annotated as a holin, this protein has not been functionally characterized.[2]

See also 
 Holin
 Lysin
 Transporter Classification Database

Further reading 
 Reddy, Bhaskara L.; Saier Jr., Milton H. (2013-11-01). "Topological and phylogenetic analyses of bacterial holin families and superfamilies". Biochimica et Biophysica Acta (BBA) - Biomembranes 1828 (11): 2654–2671.doi:10.1016/j.bbamem.2013.07.004. PMC 3788059.PMID 23856191.
 Saier, Milton H.; Reddy, Bhaskara L. (2015-01-01). "Holins in Bacteria, Eukaryotes, and Archaea: Multifunctional Xenologues with Potential Biotechnological and Biomedical Applications". Journal of Bacteriology 197(1): 7–17. doi:10.1128/JB.02046-14. ISSN 0021-9193.PMC 4288690. PMID 25157079.
 Wang, I. N.; Smith, D. L.; Young, R. (2000-01-01). "Holins: the protein clocks of bacteriophage infections". Annual Review of Microbiology 54: 799–825.doi:10.1146/annurev.micro.54.1.799. ISSN 0066-4227.PMID 11018145.
 Young, R.; Bläsi, U. (1995-08-01). "Holins: form and function in bacteriophage lysis". FEMS Microbiology Reviews 17 (1-2): 191–205. ISSN 0168-6445.PMID 7669346.

References 

Protein families
Membrane proteins
Transmembrane proteins
Transmembrane transporters
Transport proteins
Integral membrane proteins
Holins